The Mummy is a 2017 American action adventure film directed by Alex Kurtzman and written by David Koepp, Christopher McQuarrie, and Dylan Kussman, with a story by Kurtzman, Jon Spaihts, and Jenny Lumet. A reboot of The Mummy franchise as part of Universal's scrapped Dark Universe series, it stars Tom Cruise as U.S. Army Sergeant Nick Morton, a soldier of fortune who accidentally unearths the ancient tomb of entrapped Egyptian princess Ahmanet (Sofia Boutella). Annabelle Wallis, Jake Johnson, Courtney B. Vance, and Russell Crowe also star.

The Mummy premiered at the State Theatre in Sydney, Australia, on May 22, 2017, and was theatrically released in the United States on June 9, 2017, in 2D, 3D, and IMAX 3D. It received generally negative reviews from critics and grossed $410 million worldwide, losing as much as $95 million due to high production and marketing costs making it a box-office bomb. Intended to kickstart the Dark Universe, an attempt to create a modern cinematic universe based on the classic Universal Monsters film series, the film's poor box office performance led to the initial discontinuation and cancellation of the Dark Universe.

Plot

In present-day London, construction workers discover the tomb of a crusader knight who was buried with an Egyptian ruby in AD 1127. In Iraq, U.S. Army Sergeant Nick Morton and Corporal Chris Vail discover the tomb of Princess Ahmanet, who in ancient times attempted to summon the deity Set. She was then caught and mummified alive by Egyptian priests. They and archaeologist Jenny Halsey fly Ahmanet's sarcophagus to Britain, unknowingly bringing Ahmanet back to life.

During the flight, Chris is possessed by Ahmanet through a spider that bit him and attacks the others, only to be killed by Nick. A large flock of crows attacks the plane, causing it to crash, killing the crew except for Jenny, who escapes with a parachute Nick gives her.

Nick returns to life in a morgue. Chris' ghost appears and tells him he has been cursed by Ahmanet who seeks to use him as a vessel for Set. Ahmanet's mummy escapes from the sarcophagus and begins feeding on people to regenerate her body, turning them into zombies. She recovers the Dagger of Set and attempts to stab Nick, before realizing that the ruby is not attached to it. She and her army chase after Nick and Jenny until soldiers appear and subdue her.

The soldiers’ leader, Dr. Henry Jekyll, explains that Jenny is an agent of Prodigium, a secret society dedicated to hunting supernatural threats. Nick and Jenny discover that Jekyll intends to allow Set to possess Nick's body completely, believing that this will render Set vulnerable.

Jekyll transforms into Eddie Hyde. Nick stops him with a serum that Jekyll invented for this purpose, allowing Nick and Jenny to escape. Ahmanet finds them, regains the dagger, summons many crusader zombies, and creates a large sandstorm in London. The crusader zombies kill the Prodigium soldiers and Ahmanet recovers the ruby, combining it with the dagger in order to free Set.

Guided by Chris' ghost, Nick and Jenny flee into the London Underground, where Ahmanet's zombies attack them. Ahmanet captures Jenny and drowns her. When Nick is brought to Ahmanet, he sees Jenny's body, and the zombies turn to dust. Nick is injured when he tries to attack Ahmanet and lets her embrace him as a ruse to steal the dagger and shatter the ruby. He strikes the pommel of the dagger against the floor, cracking the ruby, but Ahmanet reminds him that the dagger could grant him the power to reverse death. Instead of destroying the gem, he stabs himself and his body is possessed by Set. Set goes to Ahmanet as he begins to take over, but as he looks at Jenny's dead body, Nick regains control after remembering both her and Jekyll's words, and uses Set's powers to extract Ahmanet's life-force, killing her. Struggling against Set, Nick also resurrects Jenny. Knowing that Prodigium are coming for him, he says goodbye to Jenny and vanishes.

As Ahmanet is sealed back in her tomb, Jenny and Jekyll wonder whether Nick, now fused with Set, will use his powers for good. Nick returns to the desert and resurrects Chris. The two go on an adventure to Egypt, hoping to find a cure to remove the curse, while being pictured riding horseback in the desert towards the Pyramids of Giza and creating an incoming sandstorm.

Cast

 Tom Cruise as Nick Morton, a U.S. Army sergeant. 
 Annabelle Wallis as Jennifer "Jenny" Halsey, an archaeologist.
 Sofia Boutella as Ahmanet, the title character. She is loosely based on Imhotep from the original Mummy films, as well as the ancient Egyptian goddess, Amunet.
 Jake Johnson as Chris Vail, Nick's friend and closest ally.
 Courtney B. Vance as Colonel Greenway, Nick and Chris's superior officer.

 Russell Crowe as Dr. Henry Jekyll / Mr. Edward Hyde.
 Marwan Kenzari as Malik, Jekyll's chief of security and a member of Prodigium. 
 Javier Botet as Set, the ancient Egyptian god of death.

Production

Development
Universal Pictures first announced plans for a modern  reboot of The Mummy franchise in 2012. The project went through multiple directors, with Len Wiseman leaving the project in 2013, and a second director, Andrés Muschietti, in 2014.

Tom Cruise began talks about playing the lead in November 2015, with Sofia Boutella beginning talks that December. Gwen Stefani, Jamie Chung, Lindsey Stirling and Brooke Shields were also considered. Cruise was paid between $11–13 million for his involvement. Kurtzman cast Boutella after seeing and being impressed by her largely mute performance in Kingsman: The Secret Service. Kurtzman noted that "if you look at her eyes, and this is what I got from watching Kingsman, there's a whole performance going on here. And in not saying anything but conveying that much to me, I thought oh my god, no matter how much prosthetics we put on her, no matter how much CG we put on her face, if I see this, she's going to convey something very emotional to me." Other casting news was announced between March and May, with Russell Crowe joining during the latter month.

Shortly after the film opened, Variety reported that Cruise had excessive control over the film and firm control of nearly every aspect of production and post-production, including re-writing the script and editing to his specifications, telling Kurtzman how to direct on set, and enlarging his role while downplaying Boutella's. Universal contractually guaranteed Cruise control of most aspects of the project, from script approval to post-production decisions. In a statement, Universal denied that Cruise had a negative influence on the production, "Tom approaches every project with a level of commitment and dedication that is unmatched by most working in our business today," the statement read. "He has been a true partner and creative collaborator, and his goal with any project he works on is to provide audiences with a truly cinematic moviegoing experience." Kurtzman said about the film in a 2019 interview that, "The Mummy wasn't what I wanted it to be. I'm no longer involved in that and have no idea what's going on with it. I look back on it now [and] what felt painful at the time ended up being an incredible blessing for me."

Filming
Principal photography on the film began on April 3, 2016, in Oxford, United Kingdom. Pinewood Studios and Shepperton Studios were also used for production, with underwater scenes shot at Pinewood. Filming on the movie concluded on July 17, 2016, in London. Production then moved to Namibia for two weeks, with principal photography wrapping up on August 13, 2016.

For the filming of the plane crash the production made use of The Vomit Comet and parabolic flight to simulate the illusion of weightlessness. The crew did a total of 64 takes with many of the crew becoming sick to their stomachs. Initially Kurtzman planned to shoot the scene entirely using wires and a rotating set, however Cruise's insistence changed his mind.

Post-production
Erik Nash was the film's visual effects supervisor. MPC was the top contractor, with over 1,000 effects plates. Industrial Light & Magic and DNEG also contributed to key sequences.

Music 
Composer Brian Tyler started work on the music for the movie early, writing about a half hour of music before filming even began. Working on the film for a year and half, Tyler recorded with an 84-piece orchestra and 32-voice choir at London's Abbey Road. He ultimately wrote and recorded over two hours of music, which, given the length of the film (110 minutes), resulted in a soundtrack album longer than the film itself.

Release
Initially scheduled for a 2016 release, the film was released in the United States and Canada on June 9, 2017, with international roll out beginning the same day. The film was screened in various formats, such as 2D, 3D, and IMAX 3D.

On December 20, 2016, IMAX released a trailer with the wrong audio track attached; this unintentionally prompted the creation of memes and video montages featuring the mistakenly included audio track, which was missing most of the sound effects and instead featured Tom Cruise's grunts and screams. IMAX reacted by taking down the trailer and issuing DMCA takedown notices in an attempt to stop it from spreading.

Reception

Box office
The Mummy grossed $80.2 million in the United States and Canada and $329.8 million in other territories for a worldwide total of $410 million. Due to a combined production and marketing cost of $345 million, it was estimated the film needed to gross $450 million in order to break-even, and ended up losing the studio between $60–100 million.

In North America, the film was released alongside It Comes at Night and Megan Leavey and was originally projected to gross  $35–40 million from 4,034 theaters in its opening weekend. However, after making $12 million on its first day (including $2.66 million from Thursday night previews), weekend projections were lowered to $30 million. It ended up debuting to $31.7 million, marking the lowest of the Mummy franchise and finishing second at the box office behind Wonder Woman ($58.2 million in its second week). Deadline Hollywood attributed the film's underperformance to poor critic and audience reactions, as well as "blockbuster fatigue". In its second weekend the film made $14.5 million (dropping 54.2%), finishing 4th at the box office. It was pulled from 827 theaters in its third week and made $5.8 million, dropping another 60% and finishing 6th at the box office.

Outside North America, the film opened in 63 overseas territories, with China, the UK, Mexico, Germany, Ireland, Australia, New Zealand, Brazil and Russia receiving the film the same day as in North America, and was projected to debut to $125–135 million. It opened on June 6, 2017 in South Korea and grossed $6.6 million on its first day, the biggest-ever debut for both Tom Cruise and Universal in the country. It ended up having a foreign debut of $140.7 million, the biggest of Cruise's career. In its opening weekend the film made $52.4 million in China, $7.4 million in Russia, $4.9 million in Mexico and $4.2 million in the United Kingdom.

Critical response
The Mummy received generally negative reviews from critics, with criticism aimed at its narrative tone and plot points setting up the Dark Universe. On Rotten Tomatoes the film holds an approval rating of 15% based on 314 reviews, with an average rating of 4.2/10. The website's critical consensus reads: "Lacking the campy fun of the franchise's most recent entries and failing to deliver many monster-movie thrills, The Mummy suggests a speedy unraveling for the Dark Universe." On Metacritic, the film has a weighted average score of 34 out of 100, based on 44 critics, indicating "generally unfavorable reviews". Audiences polled by CinemaScore gave the film an average grade of "B−" on an A+ to F scale, while PostTrak reported filmgoers gave it a 70% overall positive score.

Vince Mancini of Uproxx gave the film a negative review, writing: "If you like incomprehensible collections of things that vaguely resemble other things you might've enjoyed in the past, The Mummy is the movie for you." IndieWire's David Ehrlich gave the film a D−, calling it the worst film of Cruise's career and criticizing its lack of originality, saying: "It's one thing to excavate the iconography of old Hollywood, it's another to exploit it. This isn't filmmaking, it's tomb-raiding."

Owen Gleiberman of Variety wrote: "The problem at its heart is that the reality of what the movie is—a Tom Cruise vehicle—is at war with the material. The actor, at 54, is still playing that old Cruise trope, the selfish cocky semi-scoundrel who has to grow up. ... The trouble is that Cruise, at least in a high-powered potboiler like this one, is so devoted to maintaining his image as a clear and wholesome hero that his flirtation with the dark side is almost entirely theoretical." Writing for Rolling Stone, Peter Travers gave the film one star out of four, saying: "How meh is The Mummy? Let me count the ways. For all the huffing and puffing and digital desperation from overworked computers, this reboot lands onscreen with a resounding thud."

Glen Kenny of RogerEbert.com gave the film 1.5/4 stars, writing: "I found something almost admirable about the film's cheek. It's [so] amazingly relentless in its naked borrowing from other, better horror and sci-fi movies that I was able to keep occupied making a checklist of the movies referenced." Entertainment Weeklys Chis Nashawaty wrote that the film "feels derivative and unnecessary and like it was written by committee."

In BBC World News Culture, Nicholas Barber calls the film "a mish-mash of wildly varying tones and plot strands, from its convoluted beginning to its shameless non-end. Tom Cruise's new film barely qualifies as a film at all. None of it makes sense. The film delivers all the chases, explosions, zombies and ghosts you could ask for, and there are a few amusing lines and creepy moments, but, between the headache-inducing flashbacks and hallucinations, the narrative would be easier to follow if it were written in hieroglyphics."

Peter Bradshaw of The Guardian wrote that the film "has some nice moments but is basically a mess. The plot sags like an aeon-old decaying limb, a jumble of ideas and scenes from what look like different screenplay drafts," and concluded that "It's a ragbag of action scenes which needed to be bandaged more tightly." Empire film magazine was more positive, with Dan Jolin awarding the film three stars. "It's running and jumping grin-flashing business as usual for Cruise, once more on safe character territory as an Ethan Hunt-esque action protagonist who couples up with a much younger woman, while another woman chases after him," he wrote. "And if the next installment-teasing conclusion is anything to go by, Cruise seemed to have enough fun making this that he may just return for more."

In 2022, director Alex Kurtzman commented that the film is "probably the biggest failure of [his] life" and that there's "about a million things I regret about it". However, he noted that the job gave him more experience and knowledge as a filmmaker. Brendan Fraser, who starred in the previous Mummy films, stated that, in his view, the reason why the film failed: "Fun. That was what was lacking in that incarnation. It was too much of a straight-ahead horror movie. The Mummy should be a thrill ride, but not terrifying and scary. I know how difficult it is to pull it off. I tried to do it three times."

Accolades

Other media
Two video games based on the film, The Mummy Demastered and The Mummy: Dark Universe Stories, was released on October 24, 2017. The former is a Metroidvania featuring a stand-alone story, which takes place concurrently with the events of the film and follows Prodigium soldiers under the command of Dr. Jekyll who fight the forces of Princess Ahmanet, while the latter is a choose-your-own adventure game set after the events of the film, establishing the original Universal Monsters films as existing in its canon; unlike the film, both video games received positive reviews. A manga series set concurrently with the film, The Mummy: Dark Stories, was released by GANMA! from July 15 to July 29, 2017.

Cancelled franchise
The film was part of Universal Pictures' "Dark Universe", an attempt to create a modern cinematic universe based on the classic Universal Monsters film series. A remake of Bride of Frankenstein, with Angelina Jolie attached for the lead, was originally scheduled for release on February 14, 2019, but on October 5, 2017, Universal decided to postpone it indefinitely. The 2014 film Dracula Untold was originally retrospectively considered to be the first film in the series; however, since the film's release, the connection to the Dark Universe was purposefully downplayed, and The Mummy was then re-positioned as the first film in the series. On May 22, 2017, the official Dark Universe Twitter account posted an image with Tom Cruise, Sofia Boutella, Johnny Depp, Javier Bardem, and Russell Crowe standing together. The picture was revealed to be edited, as none of the cast of the Dark Universe were actually together when it was taken. By 2019, Universal announced plans to return to standalone features instead of using a shared film narrative, effectively ending the Dark Universe.

Notes

References

External links

 
 
 

2017 films
2017 horror films
Remakes of American films
American supernatural horror films
American monster movies
Films based on Egyptian mythology
The Mummy (franchise)
Dr. Jekyll and Mr. Hyde films
IMAX films
Mummy films
Reboot films
Universal Pictures films
K/O Paper Products films
Films about secret societies
Films produced by Chris Morgan
Films produced by Roberto Orci
Films produced by Sean Daniel
Films set in ancient Egypt
Films set in Iraq
Films set in London
Films shot in England
Films shot in Surrey
Films shot in Morocco
Films shot in Namibia
Films shot in Oxfordshire
Films scored by Brian Tyler
Patricide in fiction
Films with screenplays by Christopher McQuarrie
Films with screenplays by David Koepp
Films about princesses
Golden Raspberry Award winning films
Perfect World Pictures films
2010s monster movies
2017 3D films
Films shot at Pinewood Studios
Films shot at Shepperton Studios
2010s English-language films
2010s American films